Ernest Nicholas Newton Carter (born September 4, 1902 in Globe, Arizona Territory – September 26, 1997 Santa Barbara, California) was an American track and field athlete, coach and official. He ran the 1500 metres in the 1928 Summer Olympics in Amsterdam, finishing a non-qualifying 3rd place in his heat.

Carter ran for Occidental College, finishing second in the Mile run at the NCAA Men's Outdoor Track and Field Championships in 1925. He also finished third in the USA Outdoor Track and Field Championships twice, in 1927 and 1928.  Prior to Occidental, he ran for Lompoc High School, finishing second at the 1921 CIF California State Meet.

Carter graduated from Occidental College in 1928 and then moved to the Claremont Graduate University. Following college, he took a job as the Olympic track coach for the Peruvian Olympic team.

Carter made his career as the track and field coach at Santa Barbara State College which later became the University of California, Santa Barbara, starting in 1939.

Following his career as a coach, Carter was a long time AAU, TAC and USATF Commissioner and Official, serving until shortly before his death at meets like the Santa Barbara Easter Relays. He was on the Easter Relays organizing committee for 53 years.
The track at Santa Barbara City College that houses the Easter Relays bears his name. For decades, UCSB's annual invitational track meet was called the Nick Carter Invitational. He is a member of the Occidental College Track and Field Hall of Fame.

References

External links
 

American male middle-distance runners
Athletes (track and field) at the 1928 Summer Olympics
Olympic track and field athletes of the United States
American track and field coaches
Occidental Tigers men's track and field athletes
Claremont Graduate University alumni
UC Santa Barbara Gauchos track and field coaches
Sportspeople from Santa Barbara, California
People from Globe, Arizona
American referees and umpires
Athletics (track and field) officials
1902 births
1997 deaths
Sports coaches from California
Occidental College alumni